Paratachina is a genus of parasitic flies in the family Tachinidae. There are at least two described species in Paratachina.

Species
These two species belong to the genus Paratachina:
 Paratachina costae (Jaennicke, 1867)
 Paratachina obliqua (Loew, 1863)

References

Further reading

 
 
 
 

Tachinidae
Articles created by Qbugbot